The Lake Como–Hancock Bridge, commonly referred to as the Hancock Bridge is a series of two bridges crossing the east and west branches of the Delaware River after the river splits at Hancock, New York. Originally, both the west branch and east branch bridges were truss bridges. However, the east branch bridge was replaced by a girder bridge in 2005.

About the bridge
The bridge goes over the Delaware River at the West Branch. The bridge is 465.9 feet long. The bridge services two areas, Wayne County, Pennsylvania, and Delaware County, New York.

References

Bridges over the Delaware River
Bridges in Wayne County, Pennsylvania
Bridges in Delaware County, New York
Former toll bridges in New York (state)
Former toll bridges in Pennsylvania
Girder bridges in the United States
Truss bridges in the United States
New York–Pennsylvania Joint Interstate Bridge Commission